Armando Arrechavaleta Carrera (born 8 February 1975) is a Cuban rower. He competed in the men's lightweight double sculls event at the 2004 Summer Olympics.

Notes

References

External links
 
 
 

1975 births
Living people
People from Corralillo
Cuban male rowers
Olympic rowers of Cuba
Rowers at the 2004 Summer Olympics
Pan American Games medalists in rowing
Pan American Games gold medalists for Cuba
Pan American Games silver medalists for Cuba
Pan American Games bronze medalists for Cuba
Rowers at the 1999 Pan American Games
Rowers at the 2003 Pan American Games
Medalists at the 2003 Pan American Games